Nature Detectives is an online phenology research and education project for 4–18-year-olds in the UK. It is run by the Woodland Trust, as part of the UK Phenology Network.

Participants record the dates they see seasonal events, such as leafing, flowering, bird migration, nesting or fruit ripening in their own recording form on the website. The data they collect is fed into the UKPN national database, which has over 11,000 contributors and now contains over one million records.

The project monitors the activity of birds, insects, amphibians, grasses, fungi, flowers and trees, all of which are being affected by climate change. There is also information on phenology, climate change and "doing your bit for the environment".

Schools, youth groups, families and individuals all take part, and it is proving a great way to involve children in the natural world and teach them about plants and wildlife and environmental issues.

External links 
Nature Detectives
UK Phenology Network
The Woodland Trust

Climate change programs
Conservation in the United Kingdom
Chronobiology